Kirstin Kragh Liljegren is a Danish fashion model.

Early life 
Liljegren grew up in Vedbæk and Middelfart with her brothers.

Career 
Liljegren sent photos to Danish modeling agency Scoop Models and signed with them to start her career. She opened Balenciaga's S/S 2013 show at age 15. That year, she also walked for brands like Prada, Jil Sander, Valentino, and Louis Vuitton, and appeared in Zara and Missoni advertisements. Elle Macpherson chose Liljegren to model her lingerie collection called Elle Macpherson Body.

Liljegren has modeled for Elle McPherson's swimwear line, Tommy Hilfiger, Balmain, Marc Jacobs, Polo Ralph Lauren, DKNY, Oscar de la Renta, Topshop, Versace, Maison Margiela, and Rag & Bone.

She was once ranked as a "Top 50 Model" by models.com

References 

1996 births
Living people
Danish female models
People from Copenhagen
Women Management models